Petiot is a French surname. Notable individuals bearing this surname include:

 Fernand Petiot (1900–1975), French-American bartender who claimed to have created the Bloody Mary
 Henri Jules Charles Petiot (1901–1965), French writer and historian writing as Daniel-Rops
 Marcel Petiot (1897–1946), French doctor and serial killer
 Richard Petiot (* born 1982), Canadian ice hockey player